Dunbarton is an alternate spelling of Dumbarton, a town in Scotland.

Dunbarton may also refer to:

Places

Canada
Dunbarton, a community of Pickering, Ontario

Scotland
Dunbartonshire, a county
Dunbartonshire (UK Parliament constituency)
Dunbartonshire and Argyll & Bute, an administrative division

United States
Dunbarton, New Hampshire
Dunbarton, South Carolina
Dunbarton, Wisconsin
Dunbarton Cir, Williamsburg

Educational institutions
Dunbarton College of the Holy Cross, former college in Washington, D.C., United States
Dunbarton High School, Pickering, Ontario, Canada

See also
Dumbarton (disambiguation)